Laccariopsis is an agaric fungal genus with a rooting stipe, and a superficial resemblance to Laccaria. A monotypic genus, it contains the single species Laccariopsis mediterranea, which grows in sand dunes around the Mediterranean Sea on shores and colonizes Ammophila and Juniperus roots. Phylogenetically it is placed in the Physalacriaceae.

Etymology

The name Laccariopsis means (-opsis) like  a Laccaria.

References

External links
 Acta Fungorum - as Xerula mediterranea
 Funghi Italiani- as Xerula mediterranea

Fungi of Europe
Monotypic Basidiomycota genera
Physalacriaceae